{{DISPLAYTITLE:C15H11ClN2O2}}
The molecular formula C15H11ClN2O2 (molar mass: 286.71 g/mol) may refer to:

 Demoxepam
 Oxazepam

Molecular formulas